Arden Haynes,  (born August 7, 1927) was a Canadian businessman and the ninth Chancellor of York University (1994 to 1998).

Born in Saskatchewan, he attended the University of Manitoba, where he was admitted to the Zeta Psi fraternity, graduating with a Bachelor of Commerce in 1951.

He was the Chair and Chief Executive Officer of Imperial Oil Limited.

In 1988, he was made an Officer of the Order of Canada. He received honorary degrees from Acadia University and York University.

References

1927 births
Canadian businesspeople
Chancellors of York University
Living people
Officers of the Order of Canada
University of Manitoba alumni